Scene & Heard is a British registered charity that operates as a mentoring project for inner-city children in Somers Town, London.

Much of the charity's work involves teaming children with volunteer theatre professionals to write short plays, which are performed by professional actors in front of enthusiastic audiences and provide the children with an experience of success, pride and increased self-esteem. Additionally, the plays are renowned for their quirky logic, strange poetry and characters based on animals and inanimate objects.

The work is based on that of The 52nd Street Project, which has been successfully working with economically disadvantaged children in New York City for 20 years.

Scene & Heard was founded by Kate Coleman and Sophie Boyack, and its patrons are Emily Watson, Damian Lewis, and Samuel West.

Scene & Heard also has a number of honorary patrons, including Hugh Bonneville, Anna Chancellor, Jennie Darnell, Tom Goodman-Hill, Helen McCrory, Bill Nighy, Roger Lloyd-Pack, Michael Sheen, Cathy Tyson, Zoë Wanamaker and Richard Wilson.

Scene & Heard was one of the recipients of the Queen's Award for Voluntary Service in 2011.

References

External links
Scene & Heard Website

Youth charities based in the United Kingdom
1999 establishments in England